Maloye Novo is a rural locality (a village) in Sudskoye Rural Settlement, Cherepovetsky District, Vologda Oblast, Russia. The population was 107 as of 2002.

Geography 
Bolshoye Novo is the nearest rural locality.

References 

Rural localities in Cherepovetsky District